Michel Henry Allan Zitron (born June 29, 1981) is a Swedish record producer, singer-songwriter and DJ. He has, along with his main music partner John Martin, worked with Avicii, Alesso, Afrojack, Martin Garrix, Taio Cruz, Tinie Tempah and most notably Swedish House Mafia. He is also co-writer and was the vocalist on Tiësto's track "Red Lights".

Early life
Zitron was born to a Romani father and a Finnish mother, and grew up in Tensta, Stockholm. He attended a Finnish-language school until he was 12 years old.

Music career

2018: VCATION
On 27 July 2018, Michel Zitron along with John Martin launch a new music project called "VCATION". This was followed by the duo's debut single under this name entitled "Lay Low". Their second single, "When We Went Gold", was released on 21 September 2018. VCATION's first song of 2019 was released on 18 January and was called "Whiskey and Cola".

Discography

Singles

As featured artist

Songwriting and production credits

Releases under an alias

As VCATION (with John Martin)

Awards and nominations

Grammis Awards

Notes

References

External links
 Michel Zitron swedishcharts.com

Swedish singer-songwriters
Swedish record producers
Living people
Year of birth missing (living people)
Place of birth missing (living people)
Swedish people of Finnish descent
Swedish people of Romani descent
Stmpd Rcrds artists